Catastrophes in popular culture includes real and fictional disasters, as depicted by the media, and are considered social events. Disaster movies made in Hollywood are part of the American pop culture. Catastrophe types can include hostile aliens, climate change/global warming, environmental disasters, financial crises, natural disaster, nuclear apocalypse, pandemics, super heros, terrorist attacks, zombies and other technological meltdowns.

History
One of the earliest cultural catastrophic narratives is the flood myth, found among many civilizations in human history.

Theories
There are different theories why audiences consume apocalyptic films, according to filmmaker Roland Emmerich, "They are somewhat cathartic. You see all this destruction and everything but at the end the right people save the day." Wheeler Winston Dixon notes, "I think they’re sort of preparing us for something that’s going to happen in the future."

According to Eva Horn, "What makes today’s obsession different from previous epochs’ is the sense of a “catastrophe without event,” a stealthily creeping process of disintegration. Ultimately, Horn argues, imagined catastrophes offer us intellectual tools that can render a future shadowed with apocalyptic possibilities affectively, epistemologically, and politically accessible."

Fiction

In films
2012
The Day After Tomorrow
WarGames

In books
The War of the Worlds

See also
AI takeovers in popular culture
Doomsday devices in popular culture
Global catastrophic risk
Global warming in popular culture
Tunguska event in popular culture
Tropical cyclones in popular culture

References

Science fiction themes
Apocalyptic fiction
Topics in popular culture
Climate change in fiction